The molecular formula C20H25N3O2 (molar mass: 339.43 g/mol, exact mass: 339.1947 u) may refer to:

 Methylergometrine, or methylergonovine
 WAY-317,538 (SEN-12333)

Molecular formulas